Clássico do Vale do Paraíba, or Derby do Vale, is the name of the derby between São José Esporte Clube from São José dos Campos, and Esporte Clube Taubaté from Taubaté, it is a traditional Brazilian football rivalry, and it is considered the most important derby of the Vale do Paraíba region in São Paulo state, Brazil. This rivalry have been dated to 1942.

Matches
All matches are friendlies, cups, or leagues games. Home team appear first:

1942 
The first game of the rivalry, played with their amateur teams

São José 2 - 1 Taubaté April 26, 1942

1960s 
São José 1 - 1 Taubaté May 1, 1964
São José 0 - 2 Taubaté June 21, 1964
São José 0 - 1 Taubaté November 22, 1964
Taubaté 3 - 0 São José March 25, 1965
São José 0 - 3 Taubaté May 26, 1965
São José 2 - 2 Taubaté November 20, 1965
Taubaté 1 - 1 São José November 24, 1965
São José 1 - 0 Taubaté March 19, 1966
São José 1 - 1 Taubaté July 3, 1966
Taubaté 1 - 2 São José August 21, 1966
Taubaté 4 - 3 São José February 15, 1967
São José 3 - 0 Taubaté March 19, 1967
Taubaté 2 - 1 São José July 9, 1967
São José 1 - 1 Taubaté October 15, 1967

1970s 
Taubaté 1 - 1 São José July 13, 1975
Taubaté 2 - 1 São José March 13, 1976
São José 1 - 0 Taubaté July 25, 1976
Taubaté 0 - 1 São José October 17, 1976
Taubaté 0 - 1 São José May 8, 1977
São José 1 - 0 Taubaté July 10, 1977
Taubaté 0 - 0 São José April  23, 1978
São José 0 - 0 Taubaté June 25, 1978
Taubaté 1 - 0 São José July 23, 1978
São José 0 - 0 Taubaté August 27, 1978
São José 1 - 1 Taubaté March 18, 1979
Taubaté 0 - 1 São José March 25, 1979
Taubaté 0 - 2 São José July 11, 1979
São José 0 - 0 Taubaté September 9, 1979
São José 0 - 0 Taubaté September 23, 1979
Taubaté 0 - 0 São José November 18, 1979
Taubaté 2 - 1 São José November 29, 1979 This game was played in Estádio Parque Antártica in São Paulo

2000s 
São José 1 - 0 Taubaté February 15, 2004
Taubaté 4 - 1 São José March 20, 2004
Taubaté 2 - 2 São José February 4, 2007

2010s 
Taubaté 1 - 0 São José August 4, 2011
São José 2 - 1 Taubaté September 14, 2011
Taubaté 2 - 2 São José January 15, 2012
Taubaté 1 - 2 São José July 30, 2014
São José 0 - 0 Taubaté September 3, 2014
Taubaté 1 - 1 São José February 22, 2015

References

External links
 São José and Taubaté rivalry at Clássicos do Futebol Brasileiro (Brazilian Football Derbies) website

Brazilian football derbies